Snake Charmer is a collaborative EP between musicians Jah Wobble, The Edge and Holger Czukay released in 1983 through Island Records.

Track listing

Personnel 

Musicians
Holger Czukay – guitar, grand piano, French horn
The Edge – guitar
Ollie Marland – keyboards
Neville Murray – percussion
Jah Wobble – bass guitar, vocals

Additional musicians and production
Marcella Allen – vocals on "Hold on to Your Dreams"
Dave "Animal" Maltby – guitar on "Snake Charmer" and "Sleazy"
François Kevorkian – production, drum programming on "Snake Charmer", synthesizer on "It Was a Camel"
Jaki Liebezeit – drums on "Hold on to Your Dreams"
Ben Mandelson – guitar on "It Was a Camel"
Herb Powers Jr. – mastering
Paul "Groucho" Smykle – production, engineering
Stephen Street – engineering
Bruno Tilley – art direction
Jim Walker – drums on "Sleazy"
Paul Wearing – illustrations

References 

1983 EPs
Collaborative albums
Holger Czukay albums
Island Records albums
Jah Wobble albums